Three Rivers Peak is a  mountain summit in the southern section of the Gallatin Range in Yellowstone National Park, in the U.S. state of Wyoming.

Climate 
According to the Köppen climate classification system, it is located in a subarctic climate zone with long, cold, snowy winters, and cool to warm summers. Winter temperatures can drop below −10 °F with wind chill factors below −30 °F.

See also
 Mountains and mountain ranges of Yellowstone National Park

Notes

Mountains of Wyoming
Mountains of Yellowstone National Park
Mountains of Park County, Wyoming
North American 3000 m summits